Bordwell, or Boardwell, is a civil parish in County Laois,  Ireland.

Townlands
Its townlands are:
Beckfield North
Beckfield South
Bordwell Big
Bordwell Little
Chapelhill
Coolfin
Court
Curragh
Farranville
Garryniska
Grantstown
Kilbreedy
Oldglass
Rahandrick Lower
Rahandrick Upper
Shanvaghey
Tinnaragh

References

Civil parishes of County Laois